Akramjon Komilov (born 14 March 1996 in Kokand, Uzbekistan) is an Uzbekistani footballer who currently plays for Pakhtakor Tashkent.

Career statistics

Club

International

Statistics accurate as of match played 7 June 2018

Honours

Club
Bunyodkor
 Uzbekistan Super Cup: 2014

International
Uzbekistan U-23
 AFC U-23 Championship (1): 2018
Uzbekistan U-16
 AFC U-16 Championship (1): 2012

References

External links 
 

Uzbekistani footballers
1996 births
Living people
FC Bunyodkor players
Association football defenders
Footballers at the 2018 Asian Games
Uzbekistan Super League players
Asian Games competitors for Uzbekistan
Uzbekistan international footballers